Doug Stone is the debut album of the American country music singer of the same name, released in 1990. It features the singles "I'd Be Better Off (In a Pine Box)", "Fourteen Minutes Old", "In a Different Light", and "These Lips Don't Know How to Say Goodbye", all of which charted in the Top Ten on the Billboard country charts. "In a Different Light" was Stone's first Number One on that chart.

The track "High Weeds and Rust" was later recorded by David Lee Murphy on his debut album Out with a Bang. "We Always Agree on Love" was originally recorded by Atlanta in 1987.

Track listing

Personnel
Bobby All – acoustic guitar
Paul Franklin – steel guitar, Dobro
Owen Hale – drums
Kirk "Jellyroll" Johnson – harmonica
Michael Jones – background vocals on all tracks
Mac McAnally – acoustic guitar
Mark Morris – percussion
Steve Nathan – keyboards
Mark O'Connor – fiddle, mandolin
Brent Rowan – electric guitar
Doug Stone – acoustic guitar, lead vocals
Willie Weeks – bass guitar
Dennis Wilson – additional background vocals on "I'd Be Better Off (In a Pine Box)"

Charts

Weekly charts

Year-end charts

Certifications

References

Allmusic (see infobox)

1990 debut albums
Epic Records albums
Doug Stone albums
Albums produced by Doug Johnson (record producer)